Agapanthiola is a genus of beetles in the family Cerambycidae, containing the following species:

 Agapanthiola leucaspis (Steven, 1817)
 Agapanthiola sinae (Dahlgren, 1986)

References

Agapanthiini